Chris Henry Mattina (born 31 March 1993) is an American professional rugby union player. He plays as a centre, wing or full back for the Chicago Hounds in Major League Rugby (MLR). 

He previously played for Rugby United New York (RUNY) and the Austin Gilgronis in the MLR. He was also a part of the professional USA 7s residency program at Chula Vista, California.

References

1993 births
Living people
American rugby union players
Rugby New York players
University of Delaware alumni
Rugby union fly-halves
Rugby union centres
Rugby union wings
Rugby union fullbacks
Austin Gilgronis players
Chicago Hounds (rugby union) players